The 1998 VMI Keydets football team represented the Virginia Military Institute (VMI) as a member of the Southern Conference (SOCON) during the 1998 NCAA Division I-AA football season. It was the Keydets' 108th year of football and second season under head coach Ted Cain, who was replaced by interim head coach Donny White after a 1–9 start.

Schedule

References

VMI
VMI Keydets football seasons
VMI Keydets football